Dion was only 13 years old when she wrote "Ce n'était qu'un rêve", with the help of her mother and her brother Jacques. It was promoted with her first music video. Her DVDs/videos found considerable commercial success, mostly filmed from her concerts. 

In 1996, Dion released arguably the biggest music video of her career "It's All Coming Back to Me Now". Today called it "one of her biggest videos in the 90s".

In 2008, Live in Las Vegas: A New Day... became the only music DVD to be certified Triple Diamond in Canada, selling over 300,000 units and garnered the largest debut in Nielsen SoundScan history for a DVD-only release, with over 70,000 copies sold in its first week, which is something that has never occurred before in Canadian music history.

In 2018, Dion released "Ashes" (from Deadpool 2) accompanied by a music video. Time magazine called it "pure artistry", complimenting the interpretative dance routine and the chemistry. Paste magazine called it "fabulous".

International video and DVD releases

Music videos

1 Music video made from an early TV special performance.
2 Music video made specially for the  Sur les chemins de ma maison TV special. Not an official commercial video.
3 Music video made specially for the C'est pour toi TV special. Not an official commercial video.
4 Music video made specially for the Incognito TV special which aired in September 1987. Produced by Canadian Broadcasting Corporation. Not an official commercial video.

Filmography

Television

References

External links
 DVD & Video | The Official Celine Dion Site